Jeannette Theresa Dubois (August 5 – February 17, 2020), known professionally as Ja'Net DuBois, Ja'net DuBois, and Ja'Net Du Bois, was an American actress and singer. She was best known for her portrayal of Willona Woods, the neighborhood gossip maven and a friend of the Evans family on the CBS sitcom Good Times, which aired from 1974 to 1979. DuBois additionally cowrote and sang the theme song "Movin' on Up" for The Jeffersons, which aired from 1975 until 1985. After beginning her career on the stage in the early 1960s, DuBois appeared on television shows and in films into the mid-2010s.

Biography

Early life and career 
DuBois was born Jeannette Theresa Dubois in either Brooklyn, New York City, or Philadelphia, Pennsylvania. She was the daughter of Lillian Gouedy (1910–1984) and Gordon Adelbert Dubois (1915–1960) and was raised in Amityville, New York, on Long Island.

DuBois began her acting career onstage during the early 1960s, making her Broadway debut with a small role in the short-lived play The Long Dream, which ran for four days in February 1960. She appeared in the drama A Raisin in the Sun with Louis Gossett Jr., though not the original Broadway production. After appearing in the play The Blacks in October 1963, she became an understudy for the housekeeper role, portrayed by Gertrude Jeannette, in the comedy Nobody Loves an Albatross, which ran through June 1964. DuBois next appeared in the Broadway musical Golden Boy with Sammy Davis Jr., Billy Daniels, Lola Falana and Johnny Brown. DuBois portrayed Anna, the sister of Davis's character, through the entire original run from October 1964 to March 1966.

Career 
DuBois's early television acting credits include the 1969 television movie J.T. and as Loretta Allen on the soap opera Love of Life from 1970 until 1972, becoming one of the first African–American female regular cast members on a daytime series. DuBois's first film appearance was her portrayal of Vera in Diary of a Mad Housewife (1970). She landed the role of Stormy Monday in the 1973 comedy Five on the Black Hand Side and appeared in Lanford Wilson's play The Hot l Baltimore that same year.

During her time in the play, television producer Norman Lear watched DuBois on stage at the Mark Taper Forum and was impressed with her performance. He cast her in his CBS sitcom Good Times as Wilona Woods, the Evanses' neighbor and best friend of family matriarch Florida Evans, portrayed by Esther Rolle. DuBois appeared in the show from February 1974 until the show ended in August 1979. DuBois began the show as a costar alongside Rolle and John Amos (who departed the show in 1976). In 1977, DuBois's role became more prominent during the fifth season after Rolle had left the cast. DuBois returned to her costarring role when Rolle returned in the sixth and final season in 1978.

After Good Times ended in 1979, DuBois recorded the album Again, Ja'Net DuBois on her Peanuts and Caviar label in 1983. She appeared in former Good Times co-star Janet Jackson's 1987 "Control" music video as her mother. In 1992, she costarred with Clifton Davis in And I Still Rise, a play written and directed by Maya Angelou. DuBois co-starred in the films I'm Gonna Git You Sucka (1988) and Charlie's Angels: Full Throttle (2003), and on television in Moesha, The Steve Harvey Show, A Different World, Touched by an Angel and The Wayans Bros.

Other ventures and accolades 
During the 1980s, DuBois operated the Ja'net DuBois Academy of Theater Arts and Sciences, a performing arts school for teenagers on Long Island, New York. In 1992, DuBois, Danny Glover and Ayuko Babu cofounded the Pan African Film & Arts Festival in Los Angeles. In 1995, DuBois won a CableACE award for Best Supporting Actress for her role in the Lifetime movie Other Women's Children. DuBois won Emmy Awards for her voiceover work on the animated program The PJs in 1999 and 2001. DuBois, along with the other cast members of Good Times, received the Impact Icon Award at the 2006 TV Land Awards. In 2000, DuBois served as grand marshal for the North Amityville Community Parade and Festival Day in Amityville, New York. DuBois was an honorary member of the Zeta Phi Beta sorority.

Personal life 
DuBois married Sajit Gupta in 1950. According to her Brazilian consular document, DuBois was divorced from Gupta by April 1959, but another source states that she was still married in 1964. Together, DuBois and Gupta had four children: Provat Gupta, Rani Gupta, Kesha Gupta-Fields and Raj Kristo Gupta, who died of cancer in 1987 at age 36. Provat is a basketball coach based in California. In 1959, DuBois was romantically involved with actor Brock Peters.

Death 
DuBois died on February 17, 2020, of cardiac arrest at her residence in Glendale, California.

Discography 
 Movin' On Up (theme from The Jeffersons, 1975)
 Queen of the Highway (Som Livre, 1980)
 Again, Ja'Net DuBois (Peanuts & Caviar Internationale, 1983)
 Hidden Treasures (Peanuts & Caviar Internationale, 2007)

Filmography

Film

Television

Awards and nominations

Notes

References

External links 
 
 

Age controversies
2020 deaths
20th-century American actresses
21st-century American actresses
Actresses from New York City
Actresses from Pennsylvania
African-American actresses
20th-century African-American women singers
African-American women singer-songwriters
American film actresses
American musical theatre actresses
American women singers
American stage actresses
American television actresses
American voice actresses
People from Brooklyn
People from Amityville, New York
Actresses from Philadelphia
Primetime Emmy Award winners
Singers from New York City
Singer-songwriters from Pennsylvania
21st-century African-American women
Singer-songwriters from New York (state)